Ogbongbemiga is a surname. Notable people with this surname include:

Alex Ogbongbemiga (born 1993), Canadian football player
Amen Ogbongbemiga (born 1998), American football player, brother of Alex

Surnames of Nigerian origin